Barbara Edwards may refer to:

 Barbara Edwards (model) (born 1960), American model and actress
 Barbara Edwards (meteorologist), BBC television weather presenter
Barbara Edwards, character in Falcon Down